Marshan may refer to:

 Marshan Quarter in Tangiers, Morocco
 A variant spelling of the surname Marshman or Marshania
 Marshan Township, Minnesota
 Marshania (Amarshan, Marshan), a surname of Abkhaz origin.